Jorge Gambra Said (born 14 July 1963) is a Chilean former international table tennis player. He competed in tournaments for his native country but has lived in Spain since 1989.

A two-time Olympian for Chile, Gambra first appeared at the 1988 Summer Olympics in Seoul and returned as a 37-year old at the 2000 Summer Olympics in Sydney. He finished seventh out of eight competitors in the singles group stages at both Olympics.

Gambra won the men's doubles event at the Latin American Table Tennis Championships in both 1989 and 1990, with Marcos Núñez. He was a singles bronze medalist at the 1999 Pan American Games and also has two Pan American Games doubles bronze medals.

External links

References

1963 births
Living people
Chilean male table tennis players
Olympic table tennis players of Chile
Table tennis players at the 1988 Summer Olympics
Table tennis players at the 2000 Summer Olympics
Pan American Games medalists in table tennis
Pan American Games bronze medalists for Chile
Table tennis players at the 1983 Pan American Games
Table tennis players at the 1987 Pan American Games
Table tennis players at the 1999 Pan American Games
Chilean emigrants to Spain
Medalists at the 1983 Pan American Games
Medalists at the 1987 Pan American Games
20th-century Chilean people
21st-century Chilean people